Hive is an American artificial intelligence company offering deep learning models via APIs to enterprise customers. One of Hive's major offerings is to provide content moderation services based on machine learning.

Hive is reported to have been engaged to provide content moderation services to social news aggregator Reddit,  Giphy, BeReal, Donald Trump-affiliated social network Truth Social, online chat website Chatroulette, and video streaming platform Yubo.

In early 2023, Hive released an AI text classifier competitive with OpenAI's own AI text classifier.

Hive was founded by Kevin Guo and Dmitriy Karpman, and in April 2021, announced $85M in new capital at a valuation of $2 billion.

References 

Artificial intelligence laboratories